Alu chat (also spelled as alu chaat, aloo chat, or aloo chaat) is a street food originating from the Indian subcontinent, it is popular in North India, West Bengal in Eastern India, Pakistan, parts of Sylhet Division of Bangladesh and Trinidad and Tobago. It is prepared by frying potatoes in oil and adding spices and chutney. It can also be prepared with unfried boiled potatoes and also adding fruits along with spices, lime juice and chutney.

Alu chat is mainly a street food. It can be served as a snack, a side dish or a light meal. It is made from boiled and fried cubed potatoes served with chat masala. It is a versatile dish that has many regional variations. The word alu means potatoes in Hindi and the word chat is derived from Hindi word chatna which means tasting. Thus, alu chat means a savory potato snack.

References

Pakistani snack foods
Pakistani fast food
Indian snack foods
Indian fast food
Bengali cuisine
Bangladeshi cuisine
Street food
Sylheti cuisine
Trinidad and Tobago cuisine